NA-119 Lahore-III is a newly-created constituency for the National Assembly of Pakistan. It mainly comprises areas of Shalimar Tehsil along the India–Pakistan border.

Members of Parliament

2018-2022: NA-128 Lahore-VI

Election 2018 

General elections were held on 25 July 2018.

See also
NA-118 Lahore-II
NA-120 Lahore-IV

References 

Lahore